Harold Louis Coleman III (born April 4, 1986) is an American former professional baseball pitcher. He played in Major League Baseball (MLB) for the Kansas City Royals, Los Angeles Dodgers and Detroit Tigers.

Early life
Coleman was born in Greenwood, Mississippi, to Hal and Kathy Coleman. He graduated from Pillow Academy in Greenwood and attended Louisiana State University (LSU), where he played college baseball for the LSU Tigers baseball team. Coleman earned his agricultural business degree in May 2009.

Professional career

Kansas City Royals
Coleman was drafted by the Kansas City Royals in the fifth round of the 2009 MLB Draft, and was called up to the majors for the first time on April 21, 2011. That night, he pitched two scoreless innings against the Cleveland Indians in his major league debut. On May 11, 2011, Coleman recorded his first major league save by pitching a perfect 11th inning against the New York Yankees in Yankee Stadium.

The Royals placed Coleman on waivers in April 2015 with the purpose of removing him from their 40-man roster. He was re-added to the roster on September 7. On February 3, 2016, Coleman was released by the Royals.

Los Angeles Dodgers
On February 19, he signed a one-year, $725,000, free agent contract with the Los Angeles Dodgers. As a member of the Dodgers bullpen in 2016, he pitched in 61 games with a 2–1 record and 4.69 ERA.

Cincinnati Reds
On January 10, 2017, Coleman signed a minor league contract with the Cincinnati Reds. He was released on June 19, 2017.

Arizona Diamondbacks
On June 23, 2017, Coleman signed a minor league contract with the Arizona Diamondbacks. He was released on August 26, 2017.

Detroit Tigers

On February 23, 2018, Coleman signed a minor league contract with the Detroit Tigers. On May 12, 2018, the Tigers purchased Coleman's minor league contract and added him to the major league roster. In  relief innings for the 2018 Tigers, Coleman posted a 4–1 record with a 3.51 ERA and 41 strikeouts. On November 29, 2018, Coleman re-signed to a minor league deal with the Tigers. He was assigned to AAA Toledo Mud Hens to start the 2019 season. Coleman was released by the organization on July 4, 2019.

Pitching style
Coleman mostly throws a four-seam fastball and slider, with an occasional changeup to left-handed hitters.

References

External links

LSU Tigers bio

1986 births
Living people
Arizona League Dodgers players
Baseball players from Mississippi
Burlington Bees players
Detroit Tigers players
Kansas City Royals players
Leones del Escogido players
American expatriate baseball players in the Dominican Republic
Louisville Bats players
Los Angeles Dodgers players
LSU Tigers baseball players
Major League Baseball pitchers
Northwest Arkansas Naturals players
Oklahoma City Dodgers players
Omaha Royals players
Omaha Storm Chasers players
Reno Aces players
Toledo Mud Hens players
Wilmington Blue Rocks players
Syracuse Mets players